Evgheni Oancea (born 5 January 1996) is a Moldovan professional footballer who plays as a midfielder.

Career
Born in Tiraspol, Oancea started his career with Sheriff Tiraspol. He left the club in June 2019.

On 3 August 2019, he moved to Belarusian Premier League side Torpedo Minsk. He only made one appearance before the club was withdrawn from the league.

On 16 August 2019, he signed for Russian Football National League club SKA-Khabarovsk. He left the club in May 2021.

In September 2021, he moved to Moldovan National Division side Sfîntul Gheorghe.

In February 2022, he signed for Armenian Premier League club Noah. He left the club in May 2022.

In August 2022, he joined Romanian Liga II club Concordia Chiajna.

Career statistics

Honours
Sheriff Tiraspol
 Moldovan National Division: 2015–16, 2016–17, 2017, 2018
 Moldovan Cup: 2014–15, 2016–17, 2018–19
 Moldovan Super Cup: 2015, 2016

References

External links

Profile for FC Sheriff Tiraspol

1996 births
Living people
Association football midfielders
Moldovan footballers
Moldova youth international footballers
Moldova under-21 international footballers
Moldovan expatriate footballers
Expatriate footballers in Belarus
Expatriate footballers in Russia
Expatriate footballers in Armenia
Expatriate footballers in Romania
Moldovan expatriate sportspeople in Belarus
Moldovan expatriate sportspeople in Russia
Moldovan expatriate sportspeople in Armenia
Moldovan expatriate sportspeople in Romania
Moldovan Super Liga players
Russian First League players
Armenian Premier League players
Liga II players
FC Sheriff Tiraspol players
FC Torpedo Minsk players
FC SKA-Khabarovsk players
FC Sfîntul Gheorghe players
FC Noah players
CS Concordia Chiajna players